Dr. Julius Michael Hibbert, M.D. is a recurring character on the television animated sitcom The Simpsons. He is Springfield's most prominent medical professional. Although he has a kind and warm persona, he is also often characterized as greedy and lacking in empathy. His signature character trait is his often-inappropriate chuckling, which is generally cued by misfortune rather than something genuinely amusing. The character was voiced from his 1990 debut by Simpsons regular Harry Shearer, and since a recasting of all of the show's non-white characters, by Kevin Michael Richardson from 2021.

Profile
He is near-genius (with an IQ of 155), a Mensa member, a graduate of the Johns Hopkins School of Medicine, and a former stripper. Hibbert is noticeably less dysfunctional than just about everyone else on the show, though he does have a bizarre tendency to chuckle at inappropriate moments which is later revealed to be a coping mechanism. In "Make Room for Lisa", Hibbert tells Lisa that "Before I learned to chuckle mindlessly, I was headed to an early grave." He reacts questionably to certain medical problems. For example, when Maggie saved Homer from drowning, he attributed it to common cases of superhuman strength in children whose parents' lives are in danger. Likewise, he expressed only mild surprise when both of Abraham Simpson's kidneys were revealed to have exploded. In a Treehouse of Horror episode, Dr. Hibbert discusses the possibility of Bart being a "genetic chosen one" who can cure a zombie apocalypse over the phone with the Simpsons, while under siege from the aforementioned zombies. Though he manages to dispatch several with various medical equipment (taking down a nurse with an expertly-thrown syringe to the forehead), he is eventually overwhelmed and bitten after requesting that the Simpsons tell his wife that he loves her if they should encounter her.

There are hints though, that Dr. Hibbert is not above dubious medical practices. After Marge talks him out of buying an unsuitable house, he suggests repaying her with black-market prescriptions. When he realized that Marge Simpson was initially unenthusiastic about having a third child, he implied that a healthy baby could bring in as much as $60,000 on the black market. Hibbert covered for himself against Marge's horrified reaction by saying that if she had replied any other way, she would be sent to prison, claiming that it was "just a test". It was also suggested in the episode "Wild Barts Can't Be Broken" that he does not in fact have a medical license.

Despite his seemingly honest and good-hearted personality, there is evidence that he is, at heart, a committed mercenary. In "Homer's Triple Bypass", Hibbert announces to Homer that his heart operation will cost $30,000. When Homer has a heart attack in front of him in response to this news, he says, unmoved, that the cost is now $40,000 – hinting the heart attack made him now require a quadruple bypass. In "Bye Bye Nerdie", after Homer's baby-proofing business eliminates child injuries in Springfield, Hibbert complains that he is behind in his boat payments because of this. He is a committed Republican and attends Springfield's Republican meetings alongside Mr Burns, Rainier Wolfcastle, and a Nosferatu-like creature. Hibbert also freely wears fur coats, believing that while fur itself may not be murder, "paying for it sure is!"

Hibbert is often seen in flashbacks (for example, Lisa's birth, or Bart's accidents as a toddler), and each time has a different hairstyle (afro, dreadlocks, Mr. T-style Mohawk, etc.) appropriate for the time period.

Dr. Hibbert is married; he and his wife Bernice have at least three children, two boys and a girl. When his entire family is seen together, they appear to be a spoof of The Cosby Show. Bernice is known to be something of a heavy drinker; this has been joked about on at least one occasion (in "Homer vs. the Eighteenth Amendment", she faints upon reading the news that Prohibition has been introduced in Springfield) and laughs exactly like her husband. Despite apparent marriage problems, Dr. Hibbert still requests that the Simpsons tell Bernice that he loves her during a zombie apocalypse, though Homer misinterprets the message and resolves to just give her a high-five.

In the sixth season episode 'Round Springfield", it is implied that he and Bleeding Gums Murphy are long-lost brothers; Hibbert says he has a long-lost brother who is a jazz musician and Murphy says he has a brother who is a doctor that chuckles at inappropriate times, but somehow the two do not put these clues together. However, Murphy later dies, so it will never be known for certain if they are brothers or not. Hibbert also bears a striking resemblance to the director of the Shelbyville orphanage, who mentions a personal quest to find his long-lost twin to an indifferent Homer. In the 1999 episode "Grift of the Magi", we learn that Dr. Hibbert lives next door to Police Chief Wiggum.

In writers Jay Kogen and Wallace Wolodarsky's original script for "Bart the Daredevil", Hibbert was a woman, named "Julia Hibbert", who they named after comedic actress Julia Sweeney (Hibbert was her married last name at the time). When Fox moved The Simpsons to prime time on Thursdays against NBC's top-rated The Cosby Show, the writing staff decided to make Dr. Hibbert a parody of Bill Cosby's character: Dr. Cliff Huxtable. Dr. Hibbert is usually shown wearing sweaters when not on duty, a reference to Huxtable. Like the Cosby character, Dr. Hibbert laughs inappropriately, at pretty much everything. He is one of the few competent characters in the show, and was originally shown as being sympathetic to his patients' conditions, but that was eventually changed to him being less caring about his patients.

Cultural reception
A tongue-in-cheek analysis in the Canadian Medical Association Journal (CMAJ) compares the services of Dr. Hibbert and Dr. Nick Riviera, a quack physician often used by The Simpsons as an alternative source of medical advice. While Hibbert is praised for his sense of humor and quality of care, it concludes that Nick is a better role model for physicians; Hibbert is a paternalistic and wasteful physician, unlike Nick, who strives to cut costs and does his best to avoid the coroner. This study was rebutted, also in CMAJ, due to not considering other values for doctors (or whether they should have any), not considering who can see more patients in an hour, who has a better golf score, not mentioning Dr. Nick's car (given that it's acknowledged Dr. Hibbert has a Porsche), both examples not being realistic (because, e.g., no doctor can spend the amount of time either seems to spend with patients), not mentioning doctor-patient confidentiality (given that once Dr. Nick compared his to Dr. Hibbert's), neither being a woman, and neither being Canadian (thus not being attuned to specific Canadian issues like being "much colder [in Canada], [thus] Canadian doctors have to work more quickly and see more patients per hour if they are to keep warm" and "distinctly Canadian conditions such as 'constitutional fatigue' and depression brought on by watching Canadian TV shows" which are better taken care of by home-grown Canadian doctors), thus both doctors are cast aside for Dr. Bones McCoy of Star Trek as a role model, "TV's only true physician" and "someone who has broken free from the yoke of ethics and practises the art and science of medicine beyond the stultifying opposition of paternalism and autonomy. A free and independent thinker and, indeed, someone even beyond role models".

In mid-2020, amid the BLM and George Floyd protests rhetoric, the Simpsons producers declared their intentions to no longer voice characters of color by Caucasian ("white") actors. Dr. Hibbert's voice actor was then recast. Harry Shearer, the original voice actor, second-guessed this announcement, saying that actors are hired to "play someone who they are not". This came amid similar recastings; Mike Henry of Family Guy, Kristen Bell of Central Park, and Jenny Slate of Big Mouth chose to step down from voicing African-American characters. In February of the following year, it was announced that beginning with the episode "Wad Goals", voice actor Kevin Michael Richardson, who is African-American, would replace Shearer as Hibbert.

References

The Simpsons characters
Television characters introduced in 1990
Animated characters introduced in 1990
Fictional physicians
Fictional African-American people
Black characters in animation
Fictional Republicans (United States)
Fictional characters from Alabama
Fictional twins
Johns Hopkins Hospital in fiction
Fictional Mensans
Male characters in animated series
Cultural depictions of Bill Cosby
The Cosby Show
Characters created by Matt Groening